The northern olingo (Bassaricyon gabbii), also known as the bushy-tailed olingo or as simply the olingo (due to it being the most commonly seen of the species), is a tree-dwelling member of the family Procyonidae, which also includes raccoons. It was the first species of olingo to be described, and while it is considered by some authors to be the only genuine olingo species, a recent review of the genus Bassaricyon has shown that there are a total of four olingo species, although two of the former species should now be considered as a part of this species. Its scientific name honors William More Gabb, who collected the first specimen. It is native to Central America.

Description
The northern olingo is a slender arboreal animal, with hind legs distinctly longer than the fore legs, and a long, bushy tail. The face is short and rounded, with relatively large eyes and short round ears. The fur is thick and colored brown or grey-brown over most of the body, becoming slightly darker along the middle of the back, while the underparts are light cream to yellowish. A band of yellowish fur runs around the throat and sides of the head, where it reaches the base of the ears, while the face has greyish fur. The tail is similar in color to the body, but has a number of faint rings of darker fur along its length. The soles of the feet are hairy, and the toes are slightly flattened, ending with short, curved claws. Females have a single pair of teats, located on the rear part of the abdomen, close to the hind legs.

The northern olingo possesses a pair of anal scent glands, capable of producing a foul-smelling chemical when the animal is alarmed.

This is the largest of the olingo species. Its pelage is typically less rufous than the other olingos, while its tail bands are a bit more distinct.

Distribution and habitat
The northern olingo is found from Nicaragua through Costa Rica and western Panama. It has also been reported from Honduras and Guatemala, although its great similarity to other olingos, and to kinkajous, may make such reports suspect, and they are not currently recognised by the IUCN. While some individuals have been found as low as sea level, it typically inhabits montane and tropical moist forests from  up to around  elevation, although it apparently avoids plantations and areas of secondary forest.

Taxonomy
Previously, three subspecies (including the nominate) were recognized of this olingo: B. g. gabbii, B. g. richardsoni, and B. g. medius. The recent review of the genus has made several changes to the definition of this species:

The Nicaraguan population B. g. richardsoni may truly be a subspecies, but further review and analysis is needed.
B. g. medius is smaller on average than Bassaricyon gabbii and the morphologic and genetic analysis demonstrated that is a different species: B. medius (western lowland olingo).
Former species B. lasius and B. pauli have been demoted into synonyms for B. gabbii, but may be elevated to subspecies as B. g. lasius and B. g. pauli.

The closest relatives of B. gabbii are the two lowland olingo species of Panama and northwestern South America, B. alleni and B. medius, from which it diverged about 1.8 million years ago.

Diet and behavior
The northern olingo is a nocturnal herbivore, feeding almost entirely on fruit, especially figs. It has been observed to drink the nectar of balsa trees during the dry season, and, on rare occasions, to pursue and eat small mammals, such as mice and squirrels. During the day, it sleeps in dens located in large trees.

Although it has been considered to be a solitary animal, it is often encountered in pairs, and may be more sociable than commonly believed. It is arboreal, spending much of its time in trees. Its tail is not prehensile, unlike that of the related kinkajous, although it can act as a balance. The call of the northern olingo has been described as possessing two distinct notes, with a "whey-chuck" or "wey-toll" sound.

The northern olingo has a diet and habitat similar to those of kinkajous, and, when resources are in short supply, the larger animal may drive it away from its preferred trees. Predators known to feed on the northern olingo include the jaguarundi, ocelot, tayra, and several boas. It is believed to breed during the dry season, and to give birth to a single young after a gestation period of around ten weeks. It has lived for up to twenty-five years in captivity.

References

Procyonidae
Carnivorans of Central America
Olingo, Northern
Mammals described in 1876